Aperadi is a small town in Achiase District, in the Eastern Region of Ghana.

References

Populated places in the Eastern Region (Ghana)